Samrat or Samrāṭ may refer to the following people:

Given name
Samrat Chakrabarti (born 1975), British-American film actor and musician
Samrat Moze, Indian politician
Samrat Mukerji, Indian film actor
Samrat Saheba (born 1981), Indian cricketer
Samrat Sarkar, Indian playback singer
Samrat Singha (born 1989), Indian first-class cricketer 
Samrat Upadhyay, Nepalese writer

Surname
Jagannatha Samrat (1652–1744), Indian astronomer and mathematician
Pulkit Samrat, Indian film actor and model
Pappu Samrat, Pakistani choreographer